Lamorna is a fishing village and cove in west Cornwall, United Kingdom.

Other uses for Lamorna include:

 "Lamorna" (folk song)

 People

 Lamorna Ash, an English writer
 Samuel John Birch, AKA Lamorna Birch (1869-1955), an English artist
 Lamorna Watts, an English actress